90 Minutes in Heaven is a 2015 Christian drama film directed by Michael Polish and starring Hayden Christensen, Kate Bosworth, Dwight Yoakam, Michael W. Smith, and Michael Harding. It is based on the bestselling novel by the same name.  It is the first film by Giving Films, a sister company to retail chain Family Christian Stores, and though the company announced plans to donate all profits from the film to charitable organizations, the poorly reviewed film showed a loss at the box office.

Premise
Don Piper is involved in a horrific car crash, pronounced dead at the scene and covered by a tarp. Ninety minutes later, having been brought to a hospital, he returns to life and claims to have seen Heaven and visited with deceased relatives while there.

Cast
 Hayden Christensen as Don Piper
 Kate Bosworth as Eva Piper
 Dwight Yoakam as Cecil Beaumont
 Fred Thompson as Jay B. Perkins
 Michael W. Smith as Cliff McArdle
 Michael Harding as Dick Onerecker
 Rhoda Griffis as Principal Mary Nell
 Marshall Bell as Dr. Greider
 Nicholas Pryor as J.V. Thomas

Production
The project was shot in Atlanta, Georgia, and the shooting finished in March 2015.  Since its publication, Don Piper's book was twice on the New York Times Best Seller list, was listed as a USA Today best-seller, and has sold 7 million copies in 46 languages. 
The producers chose to stay as true to the book which inspired the film as possible:
Actress Kate Bosworth stated she "was amazed how Piper's story affects so many people" and that she felt blessed "to be a part of the movie's cast."  Filming began in January 2015, and by March 8, 2015, filming had wrapped and the project went into post-production.

Release

Home media

90 Minutes in Heaven was released on DVD and Blu-ray on December 1, 2015.

Reception
90 Minutes in Heaven has received negative reviews from critics. , the film holds a 26% approval rating on Rotten Tomatoes, based on 23 reviews with an average rating of 4.6/10. Metacritic gives the film a score of 28 out of 100, based on reviews from 9 critics, indicating "generally unfavorable reviews".

References

External links
 
 

2015 films
American drama films
Films about death
Films based on biographies
Films set in 1989
Films shot in Atlanta
Films set in heaven
American independent films
Fiction about near-death experiences
MoviePass Films films
Films directed by Michael Polish
2015 independent films
2015 drama films
2010s English-language films
2010s American films